Liolaemus shehuen is a species of lizard in the family Liolaemidae. It is native to Argentina.

References

shehuen
Reptiles described in 2012
Reptiles of Argentina
Endemic fauna of Argentina
Taxa named by Cristian Simón Abdala
Taxa named by Viviana Isabel Juárez Heredia